Shri Babu Ram Paliwal (25 October 1907 - 17 November 1978) was a prominent scholar as a Hindi language writer and poet. He has shown the way to the people by writing a book named Office Directory, which helps many generations by ease of simplicity in writing. His innumerable science-related talks, literary discussions, literature in Brajbhasha, biographies, plays, and stories broadcast by All India Radio, New Delhi were appreciated. He died on 17 November 1978 in New Delhi due to a prolonged illness.

He wrote most famous book Kavyadhara. His notable contribution was his involvement with the Government of India to evolve Hindi as the country's official language. He also joined the Government of India as Ministry of Home Affairs.

Life 
Paliwal was born on 25 October 1907 into a Brahmin family in Kurri Kuppa, Firozabad, Uttar Pradesh. Soon after his post graduation he joined the Ministry of Home Affairs of the Government of India, New Delhi.

Death 
From the winter months of 1977, his health started deteriorating and due to prolonged illness he died on 17 November 1978.

Major Works 
Some of notable written and published books

 Karyalay Nirdeshika
 Bharat Ke Ranveer Bankure
 Kavyadhaara
 Bharat Sarkar Ki Rooprekha
 khel-Khel Mein natak
 Yugal Mitra Aur Anya Kahaniyan
 Hamare Prerna Strotr
 His Holiness The Dalai Lama of Tibet
 Shri Guru Nanak
 Cetana
 Cham-Cham Chamka Chanda Mama (Plays)
 Kavya Sangrah (Poems Collections)

References

1907 births
1978 deaths